Kabani or Kabanah is a Syrian town in the Al-Haffah District in Latakia Governorate. According to the Syria Central Bureau of Statistics (CBS), Kabani had a population of 902 in the 2004 census.

During the Syrian Civil War
In 2016, Kabani was under the control of the Free Syrian Army's 1st Coastal Division. It witnessed over a dozen consecutive military attacks (2015–16 Latakia offensive and 2016 Latakia offensive) to control it by the Syrian Army, since it is one of the highest points in Jabal al-Akrad, that overlooks the Al-Ghab Plains, and from where the rebels still had the ability to shell government strongholds like Qardaha. Despite numerous attempts by the Syrian army to take the city, rebels have succeeded in countering every Syrian army attack, until the latest offensive from 31 May 2020.

In January 2016 at the very latest Kabani became a jihadi stronghold after the fall of Salma to the Syrian Army. From 2017 on, the town was under the control of the Salafi jihadist groups Hay'at Tahrir al-Sham and the Turkistan Islamic Party. On May 19, 2019, these groups alleged that the Syrian government had released chlorine gas on their fighting forces in the town. According to them, four militants were wounded and taken to a hospital in the nearby rebel stronghold of Jisr al-Shughur, where they were treated.

In February 2021, the jihadis were subjected to air strikes that were not reported in western media.

References

Populated places in al-Haffah District
Towns in Syria